Samuel Pole Phillips (11 March 181913 June 1901) was a prominent Australian pastoralist and politician.

Phillips was born in Culham in Oxfordshire and was educated for the Anglican ministry at Winchester College.

Emigration to Australia

He decided to emigrate to Australia and arrived in Western Australia aboard the Montreal in 1839.

Business enterprises and public role in Western Australia

He went into business with his relative, Edward Hamersley, and acquired land in the Toodyay Valley, where Phillips built his homestead named Culham. The land was acquired from Alfred Waylen, who had taken up large tracts in the area after it was explored by Robert Dale then opened up to pastoralists. After developing Culham for 12 years Phillips pioneered the area around the Irwin River and took up , which he stocked with cattle. He was later joined by Hamersley, Burges and Vigors forming a cattle stud business.

Nominated to join the Legislative Council in June 1857 he later represented the Eastern Districts and remained until his retirement in 1872.

Death and legacy

Phillips died on 13 June 1901 and was buried at the St Philip Church cemetery at Culham near Toodyay. The service was the largest seen in the district at the time. His son, Samuel James Phillips, was also a member of parliament.

The Phillips River discovered by Phillips' father-in-law, John Septimus Roe, in 1848. Roe named the river after his son-in-law, and Culham Inlet after his estate.

References

 

1819 births
1901 deaths
Australian pastoralists
Members of the Western Australian Legislative Council
People from Oxfordshire (before 1974)
19th-century Australian politicians
19th-century Australian businesspeople